Paranerita patara is a moth of the subfamily Arctiinae. It was described by Herbert Druce in 1896. It is found in Guyana and Brazil.

References

Paranerita
Moths described in 1896